The men's 4 × 400 metres relay event at the 1952 Olympic Games took place on July 26 & July 27.

The Jamaican team won the final, with the medalists breaking the 20-year-old world record.

Herb McKenley's third leg of 44.6, credited with pulling Jamaica into contention from 10 metres back, is considered one of the greatest relay legs in history, and on the last leg, George Rhoden, the 400 metres champion and Mal Whitfield the 800 metres champion, ran virtually shoulder to shoulder, but Rhoden was able to keep the lead, and beat Whitfield by a yard.

Results

Heats

Round One Heat One

Round One Heat Two

Round One Heat Three

Final

Key: WR = World record

References

Men's 4x400 metre relay
Relay foot races at the Olympics
Men's events at the 1952 Summer Olympics